Argentin is a surname. Notable people with the surname include:

Christian Argentin (1893–1955), French actor
Moreno Argentin (born 1960), Italian cyclist and race director
Raymond Argentin (1924–2022), French sprint canoeist